The 1804 Connecticut gubernatorial election took place on April 12, 1804. Incumbent Federalist Governor Jonathan Trumbull Jr. won re-election to a seventh full term, defeating Democratic-Republican candidate William Hart.

Results

References

Notes 

Gubernatorial
Connecticut
1804